Jatibonico is a municipality and town in the Sancti Spíritus Province of Cuba.

Demographics
In 2012, the municipality of Jatibonico had a population of 42,959.

Catholic Parish Church
A gallery of stained glass windows can be found at Jatibonico's St. Joseph Catholic Parish Church, unique in its kind in the whole of Cuba.

Jatibonico Oil Field
The Jatibonico Oil Field was discovered in the early 1950s by Grupo Jarueca after surface oil seeps were noticed in the area.  Oil was discovered at a depth of about 1,100 feet in a marly shale within a structural high.  This was the first new field discovered in the post-World War II era and the start of several more fields in the Central Basin of Cuba.

See also
Municipalities of Cuba
List of cities in Cuba

References

External links

Populated places in Sancti Spíritus Province